Lothar Sippel (born 9 May 1965, in Göttingen) is a German football coach and a former player.

Honours
 UEFA Cup finalist: 1993

References

1965 births
Living people
German footballers
Association football midfielders
German football managers
KSV Hessen Kassel players
Eintracht Frankfurt players
Borussia Dortmund players
Hannover 96 players
SpVgg Unterhaching players
First Vienna FC players
Bundesliga players
2. Bundesliga players
First Vienna FC managers
Sportspeople from Göttingen
West German footballers
German expatriate sportspeople in Austria
German expatriate footballers
Expatriate footballers in Austria
Footballers from Lower Saxony
German expatriate football managers
Expatriate football managers in Austria